Daily Post India is an English-language broadsheet daily newspaper published from Chandigarh, India. The first edition of the newspaper appeared on 15 July 2011. Daily Post has a special edition as well, it publishes special edition for Chandigarh and region. The Daily Post is also available in e-paper format. Daily Post newspaper is a part of Vigilant Media Pvt. Ltd.

References

Daily newspapers published in India
2011 establishments in Chandigarh